Plymouth, Devonport was, from 1832 until 2010, a borough constituency represented in the House of Commons of the Parliament of the United Kingdom.  It covered part of the city of Plymouth in South West England, including the former borough of Devonport.

History 
The constituency was created as Devonport in 1832, and elected two members until 1918, when the number was reduced to one.  Following the amalgamation of Devonport into Plymouth, the constituency was renamed as Plymouth, Devonport.

Devonport has had a number of prominent MPs, including Leslie Hore-Belisha, Michael Foot (who began his Commons career in the seat), and the former SDP leader David Owen. One of its longest serving MPs was the National Liberal, later Conservative Dame Joan Vickers, who held the seat from 1955 until her defeat at the General Election of February 1974.

Abolition
Following the Fifth Periodic Review of Westminster constituencies by the Boundary Commission for England, constituencies in Plymouth were reorganised, with both Plymouth Sutton and Plymouth Devonport being replaced by new constituencies of Plymouth Sutton and Devonport and Plymouth Moor View from 2010. The vast majority (nearly 90%) of the Plymouth Devonport constituency became part of the new Plymouth Moor View constituency; the exception was Devonport ward which became part of Plymouth Sutton and Devonport.

Boundaries
1918–1950: The County Borough of Plymouth wards of Ford, Keyham, Molesworth, Nelson, St Aubyn, and St Budeaux.

1950–1955: The County Borough of Plymouth wards of Ford, Keyham, Molesworth, Mount Edgecumbe, Nelson, Pennycross, St Aubyn, St Budeaux, St Peter, and Stoke; and the parish of Tamerton Foliot in the Rural District of Plympton St Mary.

1955–1974: The County Borough of Plymouth wards of Drake, Ernesettle, Ford, Molesworth, Nelson, St Andrew, St Aubyn, St Budeaux, St Peter, and Stoke.

1974–1983: The County Borough of Plymouth wards of Ernesettle, Ford, St Andrew, St Aubyn, St Budeaux, St Peter, and Stoke.

1983–1997: The City of Plymouth wards of Budshead, Estover, Ham, Honicknowle, Keyham, St Budeaux, and Southway.

1997–2010: The City of Plymouth wards of Budshead, Eggbuckland, Estover, Ham, Honicknowle, Keyham, St Budeaux, and Southway.

From 1950 to 1983, the constituency included Plymouth city centre.

Members of Parliament

MPs 1832–1918

MPs 1918–2010

Elections

Elections in the 1830s

 

 

 

Grey was appointed Judge Advocate General of the Armed Forces, requiring a by-election.

Elections in the 1840s
Codrington resigned by accepting the office of Steward of the Manor of East Hendred, causing a by-election.

 

Grey was appointed Home Secretary, requiring a by-election.

 

Romilly was appointed Solicitor General for England and Wales, requiring a by-election.

Elections in the 1850s
Romilly was appointed Attorney General for England and Wales, requiring a by-election.

Romilly was appointed Master of the Rolls, requiring a by-election.

 
 

Tufnell resigned, causing a by-election.

 

 

 
 

Wilson was appointed Vice-President of the Board of Trade, requiring a by-election.

Perry resigned after being appointed a member of the Council of India, causing a by-election.

 

Wilson resigned, causing a by-election.

Elections in the 1860s
Seymour resigned, causing a by-election.

Buller resigned in order to contest the 1865 Liskeard by-election.

The election was declared void on petition, on account of bribery and corrupt practices, causing a by-election.

Elections in the 1870s

Elections in the 1880s

Elections in the 1890s

Elections in the 1900s

Elections in the 1910s

General Election 1914–15:

Another General Election was required to take place before the end of 1915. The political parties had been making preparations for an election to take place and by the July 1914, the following candidates had been selected; 
Unionist: Clement Kinloch-Cooke, John Jackson
Liberal: Samuel Lithgow
Labour:

Elections in the 1920s

Elections in the 1930s 

General Election 1939–40:

Another General Election was required to take place before the end of 1940. The political parties had been making preparations for an election to take place from 1939 and by the end of this year, the following candidates had been selected; 
Liberal National: Leslie Hore-Belisha
Labour: Michael Foot

Elections in the 1940s

Elections in the 1950s

Elections in the 1960s

Elections in the 1970s

Elections in the 1980s

This constituency underwent boundary changes between the 1979 and 1983 general elections and thus calculation of change in vote share is not meaningful.

Elections in the 1990s

This constituency underwent boundary changes between the 1992 and 1997 general elections and thus change in share of vote is based on a notional calculation.

Elections in the 2000s

See also 
 List of parliamentary constituencies in Devon

Notes and references

Craig, F. W. S. (1983). British parliamentary election results 1918–1949 (3 ed.). Chichester: Parliamentary Research Services. .

Parliamentary constituencies in Devon (historic)
Constituencies of the Parliament of the United Kingdom established in 1832
Constituencies of the Parliament of the United Kingdom disestablished in 2010
Politics of Plymouth, Devon